The discography of the Serbian new wave/post-punk band Šarlo Akrobata (trans. Charlot the Acrobat, a Serbo-Croatian language version of Charlie Chaplin's name in the Kingdom of Yugoslavia), consists of one studio albums, one single and one featured compilation album.

Studio albums

Compilation albums

Singles

Music videos

External links 

 EX YU ROCK enciklopedija 1960-2006, Janjatović Petar; 

Discographies of Serbian artists
Rock music group discographies